Korpral is a Swedish military rank (OR-4).

Duties
The Corporal is a Squad Leader at Skill Level A (Basic). The Corporal can serve either as a volunteer enlistee or as a national serviceman. Requirement for promotion to Corporal is completed squad leader training. Civil servants of the Armed Forces belonging to position level 8 wear Corporal's  rank insignia when serving in uniform.

History
A Corporal was the leader of a (korpralskap) of 24 men during the Swedish allotment system. The korpralskap consisted of four Rotar (teams) of 6 men each. Each rote was led by a Rotemästare (Gefreiter). Corporals were considered non-commissioned officers in the cavalry (Corporal of horse), before the reorganization 1833/37, when Cavalry Corporals were given the rank of Sergeant. 

The corresponding rank in the artillery was Konstapel (Bombardier), created as early as the 16th century. This rank was abolished in 1972.

Earlier rank insignia

References

Military insignia
Military ranks of the Swedish Army